Frederick August "Fritz" Mollwitz (June 16, 1890 – October 3, 1967) was a German–American first baseman who played in Major League Baseball.

Mollwitz was drafted in 1913 by the Chicago Cubs from the minor leagues, where he had been playing in the Wisconsin-Illinois League. He would play with the Cubs beginning that season and into the next season until he was traded to the Cincinnati Reds for Claud Derrick. In 1916, he would return to Chicago when the Cubs purchased him from the Reds. The following year, Mollwitz returned to the minor leagues when he was purchased by the Kansas City Blues of the American Association from the Cubs. Later that year, he was traded to the Pittsburgh Pirates along with a player to be named later for players to be named later. Eventually, Roy Sanders was sent to Pittsburgh and Alex McCarthy, Ray Miller and Ike McAuley were sent to Kansas City to complete the trade. In 1919, the St. Louis Cardinals purchased Mollwitz from the Pirates.

Mollwitz died on October 3, 1967. He is buried in Brookfield, Wisconsin.

References

People from Coburg
Sportspeople from Upper Franconia
German emigrants to the United States
Major League Baseball players from Germany
Chicago Cubs players
Cincinnati Reds players
Pittsburgh Pirates players
Major League Baseball first basemen
Minor league baseball managers
Green Bay Bays players
Kansas City Blues (baseball) players
Sacramento Senators players
St. Paul Saints (AA) players
Moline Plowboys players
1890 births
1967 deaths
Burials in Wisconsin